Prague Central Station may refer to:
 Praha Masarykovo nádraží, named Praha střed (Prague Central) until 1990.
 Praha hlavní nádraží (Prague main railway station)
 Hlavní nádraží (Prague Metro), the adjacent metro station